Dynoides elegans is a species of isopod crustacean in the genus Dynoides. It was originally described in 1923 by Pearl Lee Boone as "Cianella elegans" based on specimens from La Jolla (home of the Scripps Institution of Oceanography) and San Pedro, California. It was transferred to the genus Dynoides in 2000, when Boone's genus was sunk into synonymy with Dynoides.

References 

elegans
Crustaceans of the eastern Pacific Ocean
Crustaceans described in 1923